Sandra Aguebor or Aguebor-Ekperuoh is a Nigerian mechanic. She is reported as being the first woman mechanic in Nigeria. She is also the founder of the Lady Mechanic Initiative, which trains sexually abused and underprivileged women to become mechanics and fend for themselves. Speaking on gender inequality and male privilege, Aguebor explained that she had to put in five times more effort more than men to be taken seriously, however, she decried being labelled "lady mechanic" by her colleagues instead of just "mechanic". In 2015, she was the subject of a film, produced by Al Jazeera, titled Sandra Aguebor: The Lady Mechanic. The film won awards at New York Film Festival.

Aguebor was nominated for the COWLSO award, an initiative established by Lagos State government in 1974 to honour individuals that have contributed to the "social welfare of the state". She was presented the inspirational woman of the year award by Dolapo Osinbajo and Governor Akinwunmi Ambode, who noted that she used her "skills and talent to make positive impact to the society in an area dominated by men". She was also given a national merit award by federal government of Nigeria.

Speaking to Vanguard at the graduation ceremony of 50 female mechanics, Aguebor disclosed that she has trained over 700 mechanics so far. She is married with children.

References

External links 

1970s births
Mechanical engineers
Pan-Atlantic University alumni
Nigerian feminists
Living people